Microbrontes is a genus of beetles in the family Laemophloeidae, containing the following species:

 Microbrontes blackburni (Grouvelle, 1902) Lefkovitch 1958
 Microbrontes laemophloeoides Reitter, 1874
 Microbrontes lineatus (Broun, 1893) Lefkovitch 1958

The genus Tularthrum became classified as a junior synonym in 1958.

References

Laemophloeidae